The British author J. R. R. Tolkien (1892–1973) and the names of fictional characters and places he invented for his legendarium have become the namesake of various things around and outside the world, including street names, mountains, companies, species of animals and plants, asteroids, and other notable objects.

Astronomy

 The asteroids 2991 Bilbo and 2675 Tolkien were both discovered and named in 1982. 
 The Kuiper Belt object 385446 Manwë and its moon Thorondor were discovered in 2003.
 Balrog Macula is the largest of the series of equatorial dark regions on Pluto.
 Earendel, the most-distant known star.
 The nickname "Eye of Sauron" has been given to multiple eye-like objects, namely the planetary nebulae M 1-42 and Helix Nebula, the star system HR 4796A, and the intermediate spiral Seyfert galaxy NGC 4151.
 Mordor Macula is the unofficial name of a large dark area near the north pole of Charon, Pluto's largest moon. It is named after the shadow lands in Tolkien's The Lord of the Rings, which it resembles in shape.
 The Mars-crossing asteroid 378214 Sauron was discovered in 2007.
 The trans-Neptunian object 174567 Varda and its moon Ilmarë were discovered in 2006 and 2011 (respectively) and named in 2014.

Geography of Titan

By convention, certain classes of features on Saturn's moon Titan are named after elements from Middle-earth. Colles (small hills or knobs) are named for characters, while montes (mountains) are named for mountains of Middle-earth.

Colles

Montes

Companies and other entities
Iron Crown Enterprises produces role playing, board, miniature, and collectible card games since 1980. Many of ICE's better-known products were related to Tolkien's world of Middle-earth. It was named after the crown worn by Morgoth.
Middle-earth Enterprises, formerly known as Tolkien Enterprises, is a trading name for a division of The Saul Zaentz Company, located in Berkeley, California. The company owns the worldwide exclusive rights to certain elements of J. R. R. Tolkien's two most famous literary works: The Lord of the Rings and The Hobbit. These elements include the titles of the works, the names of characters contained within as well as the names of places, objects and events within them, and certain short phrases and sayings from the works.
Palantir Technologies is a private American software and services company, specializing in data analysis. Named after the crystal balls from Tolkien's legendarium, Palantir's original clients were federal agencies of the United States Intelligence Community like CIA and NSA.
Lembas Capital is a San Francisco-based investment firm named after the Elven waybread that appears in The Lord of the Rings and The Silmarillion. The company invests in both public equity and private equity.
The Tolkien Estate is the legal body which manages the property of J. R. R. Tolkien, including the copyright in his works. The individual copyrights have for the most part been assigned by the Estate to subsidiary entities such as the J. R. R. Tolkien Discretionary Settlement and The Tolkien Trust.
Anduril Industries
Mithril, a decentralized social media platform
The Rivendell Winery operated from 1987 to December 2008 in New York's Hudson River Valley; in 2003 Rivendell's 2003 Dry Riesling captured the Governor's Cup at the 19th annual New York Wine and Food Classic.

Genes and proteins 
 Smaug, a protein that inhibits translation of mRNA nanos (Greek for dwarf) in Drosophila embryos. Named after the dragon Smaug from The Hobbit.
 Glorund, a protein that inhibits translation of mRNA nanos in Drosophila ovaries. Named after Glórund, an early name for Glaurung, the first dragon in Tolkien's legendarium.
 Bard, a gene in Drosophila that encodes the protein Bard, which is essential in degrading the protein Smaug. Named after Bard the Bowman, who killed Smaug in The Hobbit.

Individual plants and animals 
Measured by botanist Stephen C. Sillett, it is the world's third-largest coast redwood, the largest being Lost Monarch.
 Silmaril is a retired American thoroughbred mare racehorse named after the Silmarils featured in The Silmarillion.

Mountains
Three mountains in the Cadwallader Range of British Columbia, Canada: Mount Shadowfax, Mount Gandalf and Mount Aragorn.
On 1 December 2012, a bid was launched for the New Zealand Geographic Board to name a mountain peak near Milford Sound after Tolkien to mark Tolkien's 121st birthday.

Marine features 
Several undersea features in the North Atlantic Ocean, west of Ireland and south of Iceland, including:

 Eriador Seamount 
 Rohan Seamount 
 Gondor Seamount 
 Fangorn Bank 
 Edoras Bank 
 Isengard Ridge

At least three seamounts in the Indian Ocean, including: 
 Eye of Sauron
 Barad-dûr
 Ered Lithui

Music

Amon Amarth, a Swedish melodic death metal band, that takes its name from the Sindarin name of Mount Doom.
 Burzum, a Norwegian music project founded by Varg Vikernes in 1991. The word "burzum" means "darkness" in the black speech, a fictional language crafted by Tolkien.
 Ephel Duath, an Italian avant garde metal/hardcore punk band, formed in 1998 took their name after the mountain range in The Lord of the Rings.
 Gorgoroth, a Norwegian black metal band, named after the dead plateau of darkness in the land of Mordor.
 , a neo-prog band from Baltimore, US, took their name from Eru Iluvatar.
 Marillion, a British rock band, formed in 1979, was named "The Silmarillion", but was shortened to Marillion in 1981 to avoid potential copyright conflicts.
 Shadowfax, a new-age group, took its name from Gandalf the White's horse Shadowfax.

Ships
 J.R. Tolkien, a gaff-topsail schooner of Netherlands registry used for passenger cruises on the Baltic Sea and elsewhere in European waters, was built in 1964, and renamed in honour of Tolkien in 1998.

Street names and places
The "Tolkien Road" in Eastbourne, East Sussex, was named after Tolkien whereas the "Tolkien Way" in Stoke-on-Trent is named after Tolkien's eldest son, Fr. John Francis Tolkien, who was the priest in charge at the nearby Roman Catholic Church of Our Lady of the Angels and St. Peter in Chains. In the Hall Green and Moseley areas of Birmingham there are a number of parks and walkways dedicated to J. R. R. Tolkien—most notably, the Millstream Way and Moseley Bog. Collectively the parks are known as the Shire Country Parks. In the Dutch town of Geldrop, near Eindhoven, the streets of an entire new neighbourhood are named after Tolkien himself ("Laan van Tolkien") and some of the best-known characters from his books. Also in Weston-super-Mare, Somerset, England there are a collection of roads in the 'Weston Village' named after locales of Middle Earth, namely Hobbiton Road, Bree Close, Arnor Close, Rivendell, Westmarch Way and Buckland Green.

In the Silicon Valley towns of Saratoga and San Jose in California, there are two housing developments with street names drawn from Tolkien's works. About a dozen Tolkien-derived street names also appear scattered throughout the town of Lake Forest, California. The Columbia, Maryland, neighbourhood of Hobbit's Glen and its street names (including Rivendell Lane, Tooks Way, and Oakenshield Circle) come from Tolkien's works. The Bend, Oregon housing development Forest Creek (formerly "The Shire") features the Tolkien-inspired names Ring Bearer Court, Shire Lane, and Wizard Lane. One of the student housing complexes at the University of California, Irvine is named Middle Earth; its halls and other facilities were selected from Tolkien's legendarium.

Two streets at Warsaw, Poland were named in 2022 after J.R.R. Tolkien and Gandalf. Both streets are located at neighbourhood commonly called Mordor.

Taxonomy
It has been noted that "Tolkien has been accorded formal taxonomic commemoration like no other author." In the field of taxonomy, over 180 taxa (genera and species) have been given scientific names honouring, or deriving from, characters or other fictional elements from The Lord of the Rings, The Hobbit, and other works set in Middle-earth.

Several taxa have been named after the character Gollum (also known as Sméagol), as well as for various hobbits, the small humanlike creatures such as Bilbo and Frodo Baggins. Various elves, dwarves, and other creatures that appear in his writings. Tolkien himself has been honoured in the names of several species. In 1978, paleontologist Leigh Van Valen named over 20 taxa of extinct mammals after Tolkien lore in a single paper. The entomologist Karl-Johan Hedqvist, also a fan of Tolkien, named several wasp genera after Tolkien's characters. In 1999, entomologist Lauri Kaila described 46 new species of Elachista moths and named 38 of them after Tolkien mythology.

In 2004, the extinct hominid Homo floresiensis was described, and quickly earned the nickname "hobbit" due to its small size.

Named after J. R. R. Tolkien

Named after the Ainur

Named after Elves

Named after Dwarves

Named after Men (Humans)

Named after Hobbits

Named after Orcs

Named after the Nazgûl

Named after Ents

Named after other characters

Named after animals

Named after objects and locations

Named after Elvish words

Named after other works

See also 
Reception of J. R. R. Tolkien
Works inspired by J. R. R. Tolkien

Notes

References

Works cited

Tolkien
Middle-earth lists
Things named after Tolkien works